The NWA Brass Knuckles Championship was a professional wrestling championship sanctioned by the National Wrestling Alliance. The Texas Brass Knuckles Championship was revived by the NWA in June 1998, and was renamed the NWA Texas Hardcore Championship on April 1, 1999. Finally, the title was abandoned on April 15, 2001.

Title history

See also
List of National Wrestling Alliance championships

References

National Wrestling Alliance championships
Hardcore wrestling championships
Regional professional wrestling championships
Professional wrestling in Texas